Cleome chelidonii is a species of plant in the family Cleomaceae. It is native to India, Sri Lanka, Southeast Asia, and Java.

References 

chelidonii